Tones Of Home: The Best of Blind Melon is a compilation album by Blind Melon released on September 27, 2005.  It is the fifth Blind Melon album and the third album after the death of lead singer Shannon Hoon.

Track listing
"Tones of Home" (4:28)
"Change" (3:42)
"Paper Scratcher" (3:15)
"No Rain" (3:38)
"I Wonder" (5:33)
"Time" (6:03)
"Galaxie" (2:52)
"Mouthful of Cavities" (Edit) (3:21)
"Walk" (2:47)
"Toes Across the Floor" (3:06)
"2 x 4" (4:01)
"St. Andrew's Fall" (4:15)
"Soup" (3:12)
"Pull" (3:28)
"Soul One" (3:16)
"No Rain" (Ripped Away Version) (2:25)
"Three Is a Magic Number" (3:15)
"Soak the Sin" (live) (5:31)
"Deserted" (live) (7:24)

2005 greatest hits albums
Blind Melon albums
Capitol Records compilation albums